NBC Rochester and NBC 10 Rochester may refer to:

WHEC-TV in Rochester, New York
KTTC in Rochester, Minnesota